Muda is a village in Hiiumaa Parish, Hiiu County in northwestern Estonia.

Bagpipe players Juhan Maaker (1845–1930) and Aleksander Maaker (1890–1968) were born and lived in Muda.

References

 

Villages in Hiiu County